Herbert Baxter may refer to:
 Herbert James Baxter (1900–1974), British judge, intelligence officer and politician
 Herbert Hill Baxter (1894–1967), mayor of Charlotte, North Carolina